Ruth Ashdown (born 13 September 1978) is an English retired muay thai fighter who competed professionally from 2007 to 2018. She is the former WBC Muaythai world flyweight and super-bantamweight champion, as well as the former WBC Muaythai International and Diamond champion. She is one of just five diamond belt holders in the world.

She is the former World Muaythai Council European flyweight and the former International Combat Organisation Muay Thai champion. She is also the former ISKA Oriental Rules world flyweight champion, and IKF British Pro flyweight champion.

In 2018 the UK Muay Thai Awards voted her the Best Female Fighter of the Year, and in 2020 World Boxing Council inducted her into the Hall of Fame.

Muay Thai career
Ruth Ashdown began her muay thai career in 2007, after she began training at the Lumpini Crawley gym. Her first title came in 2008, winning the IKF British flyweight title, after winning a split decision against Michelle Grizzle. After accumulating a 4–1 record, she was given an opportunity to fight for the WMC 118 lbs European title. She won the fight by unanimous decision.

Following this, she went 5-2-1, with her draw and one of her losses coming at the hands of the future WBC Muaythai European champion Soraya Bucherie. Following a two fight win streak, she was given a chance to fight for the ISKA World Oriental flyweight championship against Serrin Murray. Ashdown won a unanimous decision. This three fight win streak would earn her the chance to fight Ekaterina Vandaryeva for the ICO 118 lbs title. She won the title by a second-round TKO.

Her next fight was likewise for the title, this time for the WBC Muaythai 118 lbs International title, against Kate Stables. Ashdown won by a unanimous decision.

She next fought for the WBC Muaythai European title, in a rubber match Soraya Bucherie. Ashdown would lose by decision.

In 2013 she won her first world title, the WBC Muaythai 118 lbs belt, after defeating Lailla Akounad by way of TKO. She lost the title in her first title defense to Lena Ovchynnikova.

In 2016 she won a unanimous decision against Sveva Melillo to clinch her second world title, the WBC Muaythai 122 lbs championship.

Her last career fight was also her last title fight. In 2018 she fought Dokmaipa Kiatpompetch for the WBC Muaythai 122 lbs belt. Ashdown won her sixth major title, with a unanimous decision win over the Thai fighter.

Ruth Ashdown now runs Strong Yoga classes on Zoom and in Haywards Heath and Crawley and runs Thai Boxing classes and personal training in Haywards Heath.

Championships and accomplishments
International Kickboxing Federation
IKF Pro British flyweight championship
World Muaythai Council
WMC European flyweight championship
International Combat Organisation
ICO World flyweight championship
International Sport Karate Association 
ISKA World Oriental Rules flyweight championship
World Boxing Council Muaythai
WBC Muaythai International flyweight championship
WBC Muaythai flyweight championship
WBC Muaythai super-bantamweight championship
WBC Muaythai Diamond super-bantamweight championship
WBC Hall of Fame Inductee 
UK Muay Thai Awards
2018 Female Fighter of the Year

Muay Thai record

|-  bgcolor=
|-  bgcolor="#CCFFCC"
| 2018-8-15|| Win||align=left|Dokmaipa Kiatpompetch || WBC Diamond Belt || Hong Kong, China || Decision (Unanimous) || 5 || 3:00|| 25-9-1
|-
! style=background:white colspan=9 |
|-
|-  bgcolor="#CCFFCC"
| 2018-5-26|| Win||align=left|Asia Walkorskia || Muaythai Mahyem || Copthorne, West Sussex, United Kingdom || TKO || 3 || || 24-9-1
|-  bgcolor="#CCFFCC"
| 2018-4-7|| Win||align=left|Eva Schultz || Lion Fight 41 || London, United Kingdom || Decision (Unanimous) || 3 || 3:00 || 23-9-1
|-  bgcolor="#FFBBBB"
| 2017-9-3|| Loss||align=left|Saskia D'Effremo || Road To Mayhem || London, United Kingdom || TKO || 4 ||  || 22-9-1
|-  bgcolor="#CCFFCC"
| 2017-5-4|| Win||align=left|? || Samui International Muay Thai Stadium || Ko Samui, Thailand || Decision (Unanimous) || 3 || 3:00 || 22-8-1
|-  bgcolor="#CCFFCC"
| 2017-3-4|| Win||align=left|Cindy Silvestre || Pantheon Fight Series - Imperium || Hastings, United Kingdom || Decision (Unanimous) || 3 || 3:00 || 21-8-1
|-  bgcolor="#CCFFCC"
| 2016-11-19|| Win||align=left|Sveva Melillo || Muaythai Mayhem || Copthorne, West Sussex, United Kingdom || Decision (Unanimous) || 5 || 3:00 || 20-8-1
|-
! style=background:white colspan=9 |
|-
|-  bgcolor="#CCFFCC"
| 2016-4-16|| Win||align=left|Filipa Correia || Muaythai Mayhem || Copthorne, West Sussex, United Kingdom || Decision (Unanimous) || 3 || 3:00 || 19-8-1
|-  bgcolor="#CCFFCC"
| 2015-11-21|| Win||align=left|Gloria Peritore || Muaythai Mayhem || Copthorne, West Sussex, United Kingdom || Decision (Unanimous) || 3 || 3:00 || 18-8-1
|-  bgcolor="#CCFFCC"
| 2015-7-19|| Win||align=left|Meryem Uslu || Muaythai Mayhem || Copthorne, West Sussex, United Kingdom || Decision (Unanimous) || 3 || 3:00 || 17-8-1
|-  bgcolor="#CCFFCC"
| 2015-6-4|| Win||align=left|Nadia Grivas || X Posure Fight Series 1 || Londres, United Kingdom || TKO || 3 ||  || 16-8-1
|-  bgcolor="#FFBBBB"
| 2014-11-8|| Loss||align=left|Maria Lobo || Muaythai Mayhem || Copthorne, West Sussex, United Kingdom || Decision (Unanimous) || 3 || 3:00 || 15-8-1
|-  bgcolor="#FFBBBB"
| 2014-7-19|| Loss||align=left|Lena Ovchynnikova || Hot Summer Fights || Cabazon, United States || Decision (Unanimous) || 3 || 3:00 || 15-7-1
|-
! style=background:white colspan=9 |
|-
|-  bgcolor="#FFBBBB"
| 2014-3-8|| Loss||align=left|Patrizia Gibelli || Lion Belt Fight Night 4 || Belfort, France || Decision (Unanimous) || 3 || 3:00 || 15-6-1
|-  bgcolor="#CCFFCC"
| 2013-11-2|| Win||align=left|Lailla Akounad || WBC hits the Millenium || Copthorne, West Sussex, United Kingdom || TKO || 2 ||  || 15-5-1
|-
! style=background:white colspan=9 |
|-
|-  bgcolor="#CCFFCC"
| 2013-6-22|| Win||align=left|Estela Gil || Muaythai Mayhem || Copthorne, West Sussex, United Kingdom || Decision (Unanimous) || 3 || 3:00 || 14-5-1
|-  bgcolor="#FFBBBB"
| 2013-5-25|| Loss||align=left|Soraya Bucherie || One vs One || Trappes, France || Decision (Unanimous) || 5 || 3:00 || 13-5-1
|-
! style=background:white colspan=9 |
|-
|-  bgcolor="#CCFFCC"
| 2013-3-9|| Win||align=left|Kate Stables || Smash Muaythai 3 || Liverpool, United Kingdom || Decision (Unanimous) || 5 || 3:00 || 13-4-1
|-
! style=background:white colspan=9 |
|-
|-  bgcolor="#CCFFCC"
| 2012-11-3|| Win||align=left|Ekaterina Vandaryeva || Muaythai Mayhem || Copthorne, West Sussex, United Kingdom || TKO || 3 ||  || 12-4-1
|-
! style=background:white colspan=9 |
|-
|-  bgcolor="#CCFFCC"
| 2011-10-29|| Win||align=left|Serin Murray || Newcastle Panthers || Newcastle, United Kingdom || Decision (Unanimous) || 5 || 3:00 || 11-4-1
|-
! style=background:white colspan=9 |
|-
|-  bgcolor="#CCFFCC"
| 2011-8-13|| Win||align=left|Daisy Breinburg || Muaythai Mayhem || Copthorne, West Sussex, United Kingdom || Decision (Unanimous) || 3 || 3:00 || 10-4-1
|-  bgcolor="#CCFFCC"
| 2010-6-19|| Win||align=left|Michelle Newall || The Ladykillers 4 || Wythenshawe, United Kingdom || Decision (Unanimous) || 3 || 3:00 || 9-4-1
|-  bgcolor="#FFBBBB"
| 2010-5-29|| Loss||align=left|Soraya Bucherie || MSA Muay Thai Premier League || London, United Kingdom || Decision (Unanimous) || 3 || 3:00 || 8-4-1
|-  bgcolor="#CCFFCC"
| 2010-5-1|| Win||align=left|Cécile Gauthiere || Onesongchai Muay Thai || Rimini, Italy || Decision (Unanimous) || 3 || 3:00 || 8-3-1
|-  bgcolor="#c5d2ea"
| 2010-4-11|| Draw||align=left|Soraya Bucherie|| Warriors || Crawley, United Kingdom || Decision (Unanimous) || 3 || 3:00 || 7-3-1
|-  bgcolor="#FFBBBB"
| 2009-10-31|| Loss||align=left|Seda Duygu Aygun || Boks Gecesi || Istanbul, Turkey || Decision (Unanimous) || 3 || 3:00 || 7-3
|-  bgcolor="#CCFFCC"
| 2009-8-1|| Win||align=left|Angelica Falk || Muaythai Legends || Croydon, United Kingdom || Decision (Unanimous) || 3 || 3:00 || 7-12
|-  bgcolor="#CCFFCC"
| 2009-2-7|| Win||align=left|Sarai Medina ||  Muaythai Legends - England vs Thailand || Croydon, United Kingdom || Decision (Unanimous) || 3 || 3:00 || 6-2
|-  bgcolor="#CCFFCC"
| 2008-8-16|| Win||align=left|Leonor Agostinho ||  Muaythai Legends - England vs Thailand || Croydon, United Kingdom || Decision (Unanimous) || 3 || 3:00 || 5-2
|-
! style=background:white colspan=9 |
|-  bgcolor="#FFBBBB"
| 2008-7-26|| Loss||align=left|Christine Toldeo || World Championship Muay Thai || Las Vegas, United States || Decision (Unanimous) || 3 || 3:00 || 4-2
|-
|-  bgcolor="#CCFFCC"
| 2008-5-27|| Win||align=left|Charlotte Webster || The Ladykillers III || Altrincham, United Kingdom || Decision (Unanimous) || 3 || 3:00 || 3-1
|-
|-  bgcolor="#CCFFCC"
| 2008-5-27|| Win||align=left|Christi Brereton || ? || London, United Kingdom || Decision (Unanimous) || 2 || 3:00 || 2-1
|-
|-  bgcolor="#CCFFCC"
| 2008-2-16|| Win||align=left|Michelle Grizzle || The Ladykillers II || Wythenshawe, United Kingdom || Decision (Split) || 5 || 2:00 || 1-1
|-
! style=background:white colspan=9 |
|-
|-  bgcolor="#FFBBBB"
| 2008|| Loss||align=left|Michelle Grizzle || The Ladykillers I || ?, United Kingdom || Decision (Unanimous) || 3 || 2:00 || 0-1
|-
! style=background:white colspan=9 |
|-
|-
| colspan=9 | Legend:

See also
 List of female kickboxers
 List of WBC Muaythai female world champions
 List of WBC Muaythai diamond champions

External links
 Official Website
 Official Facebook profile

References 

1978 births
Sportspeople from West Sussex
English female kickboxers
Living people
Female Muay Thai practitioners
English Muay Thai practitioners
Sportspeople from Crawley